Annaleigh Amanda Ashford (née Swanson; born June 25, 1985) is an American actress, singer, and dancer. She is known for her work on television as Betty DiMello on the Showtime period drama Masters of Sex, and on Broadway as Lauren in Kinky Boots (2013–14) and her Tony Award–winning performance as Essie Carmichael in You Can't Take it With You (2014–15). In 2017, Ashford starred in the critically acclaimed, limited-run revival of Sunday in the Park with George opposite Jake Gyllenhaal.

She released her debut recording Lost in the Stars: Live at 54 Below in 2015. Ashford's other notable film and television credits include Unbelievable (2019), Bad Education (2019), the FX drama Impeachment: American Crime Story (2021), and the CBS sitcom B Positive (2020–22).

Early life
Ashford was born in Denver on June 25, 1985, the daughter of Holli Swanson, an elementary school gym teacher, and Chris Swanson, a small-business owner. Ashford participated in Kids Cross Country and track at the age of six, coached by her mother. Ashford discovered that she hated running, and it was very clear that she was more interested in the race uniforms than the actual races. The last race she ever ran was the 400 metre dash. After that, her mother enrolled her in the nearest dance studio. She began practicing at Kit Andrée's Dance and Performing Arts Center the same day she started the second grade. She acted and sang in numerous performances and competitions in her hometown. Ashford's professional career began at age nine in Denver, when she was cast as Tina Denmark, the lead in the musical Ruthless!. At fourteen, she was profiled as "The Teen to Watch" by the Rocky Mountain News. Other Denver credits include appearing in the ensemble of The Sound of Music, West Side Story, and Paint Your Wagon, as well as in Little Women as Amy March, Rodgers and Hammerstein's Cinderella as Ella, Grease as Sandy Dumbrowski, and Anything Goes as Reno Sweeney. She graduated from Wheat Ridge High School in three years, at the age of 16, and then attended Marymount Manhattan College, where she earned a degree in theatre in another three years, at the age of 19. While attending Marymount Manhattan College, Ashford played Rosa Bud in The Mystery of Edwin Drood and Emma in Tell Me on a Sunday.

Career

2004–09: Hollywood Starr, Feeling Electric, and Wicked
In 2004, while hanging around in New York City's Lower East Side club scene, Ashford met nightlife personality Lady Starlight, a local rock DJ and performance artist. Lady Starlight invited Ashford to dance at her 1970s glitter rock party "Lady Starlight's English Disco" and christened her Hollywood Starr. Ashford performed in Tom Kitt and Brian Yorkey's Feeling Electric as Natalie at the New York Musical Theatre Festival in 2005.

Soon after graduating from college, Ashford got her big break performing as one of Glinda's friends, Pfanne, and understudying the role of Glinda on the First National Tour of Wicked. She joined the cast in December 2005 and left in September 2006. She then originated the role of Margot in Legally Blonde: The Musical, her Broadway debut. She understudied the lead role of Elle Woods, but only played it once. She was featured on the original cast recording and appeared in the MTV televised airing. Ashford left the show in September 2007.

In July 2007, she worked on a musical adaptation of Catch Me If You Can as Brenda Strong. She previously did a staged reading for the project under the Tony Award-winning director of Hairspray, Jack O'Brien.

Ashford then returned to Wicked, this time playing the lead role of Glinda in the Broadway production. She replaced Kendra Kassebaum on October 9, 2007. She departed the company on May 11, 2008, when Kassebaum returned to the role, and transferred to the Chicago production, replacing Kate Fahrner as Glinda on June 3, 2008. She played her final performance as Glinda on January 25, 2009, when the Chicago production closed.

In 2008, she made her film debut with a small part in Sex and the City: The Movie playing a "spoiled label queen". She also appeared in the film Rachel Getting Married as a counter girl.

In August 2008, Ashford played Wednesday Addams in the staged reading for musical adaptation of The Addams Family with Nathan Lane and Bebe Neuwirth, but she was later replaced by Krysta Rodriguez. Other readings include Bring It On: The Musical as Campbell, The Black Suits, C'mon Get Happy, Pal Joey, and a gender-bent version of Stephen Sondheim's Company.

In 2009, it was announced that Ashford would be one of the principal characters and singers in the new vaudeville styled Cirque du Soleil show, Banana Shpeel. However, it was later announced that Ashford and her colleague Michael Longoria were no longer in the cast of the show. Publicists announced that it was a creative decision to remove large portions of dialogue from the show, therefore making their characters non-existent. Ashford was originally slated to stay in the production from its premiere in Chicago until sometime in 2010.

2010–13: Kinky Boots, Masters of Sex, and Frozen
Ashford starred as Jeanie in the Broadway revival of Hair. She succeeded Kacie Sheik in the role from March 9, 2010, through June 27, 2010, when the production closed.

In September 2010, Ashford made her directorial debut at Birdland Jazz Club, directing fellow Hair alum Jay Armstrong Johnson in his solo concert debut. The concert was met with rave reviews, including a notice for Ashford's "thoughtfully put together" directorial style.

In September 2010, Ashford played Veronica Sawyer in a concert version of the new musical Heathers.in New York City.  The role was later played by Barrett Wilbert Weed in the 2014 off-Broadway premiere.

In November 2010, Ashford was part of a reading of the musical Carrie. In December 2010, she participated in a "creative workshop" reading of the stage musical version of Diner as Beth.

In January 2012, Ashford ended her run playing Maureen Johnson in the Off-Broadway revival of Rent, which began July 14, 2011 and closed on September 9, 2012. Emma Hunton replaced Ashford as Maureen on January 13, 2012. In February 2012, Ashford made a cameo on Smash as Lisa McMann and returned for another short appearance in 2013 before the show's cancellation.

From June 27 to August 19, 2012, she appeared in the Off-Broadway musical Dogfight, based on the 1991 film of the same name, playing a toothless hooker named Marcy. The role was played in the film by Elizabeth Daily. Ashford also performed on the original cast recording of the musical.

In 2013, Ashford provided the voice of a troll in Frozen. She has a short line greeting Kristoff and sings the second female solo after Maia Wilson in the song "Fixer Upper" for the soundtrack.

In 2013, after appearing in the Chicago try-outs, Ashford reprised her role as Lauren in the Broadway production of Kinky Boots, a musical with a book by Harvey Fierstein and music and lyrics by Cyndi Lauper. For this role, Ashford received nominations for the Tony Award for Best Featured Actress in a Musical and the Drama Desk Award for Outstanding Featured Actress in a Musical. Ashford left her role in Kinky Boots on March 2, 2014.

In 2013, Ashford appeared in the recurring role of young sex worker Betty DiMello in season one of the Showtime series Masters of Sex. Her part was upgraded from a recurring to regular for Season 2.

2014–15: Debut album, You Can't Take It With You, and Sylvia

On January 14, 2014, Ashford released her first single, "Another Time (Andrew's Song)", with musical director Will Van Dyke on iTunes. In addition to writing music and lyrics, Van Dyke is the featured pianist on the single. The track also features Michael Aarons on guitar, Steve Gilewski on bass, Sammy Merendino on drums, Philip Payton on violin/viola, and Allison Seidner on cello. It was recorded at Harlem Parlour Recording in New York City by Derik Lee, who also mixed and mastered the recording.

Beginning on August 26, 2014, Ashford played the role of Essie Carmichael in the Broadway revival of You Can't Take It with You, directed by Scott Ellis. She appeared alongside Rose Byrne, James Earl Jones, and Elizabeth Ashley. The show closed on February 2, 2015. For this role, Ashford won the 2015 Tony Award for Best Featured Actress in a Play.

In a limited run from October 2, 2015, to January 3, 2016, Ashford starred as the titular canine in the first Broadway production of A. R. Gurney's comedy Sylvia. The show opened at the Cort Theatre on October 27, 2015. Directed by Daniel J. Sullivan, the show also starred Julie White, Matthew Broderick, and Robert Sella. Tony Award-winning director Daniel Sullivan compared Ashford to Bill Irwin, writing, "she is a great clown, aside from being a wonderful actor...she has that same kind of, just throw it up there, keep trying, finding it, and refining it."

Ashford's debut album Lost in the Stars: Live at 54 Below was released November 13, 2015.

On November 17, 2015, it was announced that Ashford had signed with talent agency ICM Partners.

On November 20, 2015, BroadwayWorld announced that Ashford would be the involved in a filmed career retrospective Q&A with SAG-AFTRA, taking place on December 3, 2015, at The New School. The Q&A was released via YouTube on December 14, 2015.

On November 20, 2015, Ashford was selected to present the sixth annual Clive Barnes Theatre Award, taking place on January 11, 2016.

On November 30, 2015, Ashford played eight roles in a reading of Paul Rudnick's critically acclaimed play Jeffrey, directed by Christopher Ashley. Other cast included Michael Urie, Robin de Jesus, James Monroe Iglehart, Andrew Keenan-Bolger, and Russell Tovey.

2016–present: Sunday in the Park, American Crime Story, and B Positive
On February 1, 2016, it was announced that Ashford would play the role of Columbia in the FOX television remake The Rocky Horror Picture Show: Let's Do the Time Warp Again.

On July 14, 2016, it was announced that Ashford would be starring opposite Jake Gyllenhaal in New York City Center's three October concert performances ofSunday in the Park with George as Dot/Marie, a role originated by Bernadette Peters on Broadway.

On December 13, 2016, it was announced that Ashford would reprise her role as Dot/Marie opposite Gyllenhaal in Sunday in the Park with George in the show's Broadway 10-week revival at the Hudson Theater. Ashford was not eligible for a Tony Award for this performance, as the production withdrew itself from any award competition, including the Tony Awards. A statement was released on February 3, 2016 saying: "The producers of Sunday in the Park with George will not be submitting Hudson Theatre’s engagement of this New York City Center production for awards eligibility. With a season so full of tremendous, soon-to-be long-running new musicals and revivals, the producers feel this extremely limited, special run stands most appropriately outside of any awards competition. The production is nevertheless proud to be part of such a landmark Broadway season."

On April 4, 2017, it was announced that Ashford would be joining The Public Theater's Shakespeare in the Park production of A Midsummer Night's Dream as Helena.

On April 20, 2017, it was announced that the revival of Sunday in the Park with George would be preserved on an album to be released by Warner Music Group. The cast recording was released on September 21, 2017. It was produced and mixed by Bart Migal and features the full Broadway company, including Jake Gyllenhaal, Robert Sean Leonard, Erin Davie, and Penny Fuller.

On September 12, 2017, it was announced that Ashford would join the cast of Woody Allen's drama film A Rainy Day in New York, which was completed on October 23, 2017. The film was released in Europe, Asia, Central America, and South America in 2019 and in the UK and US in 2020. On November 3, 2017, it was announced that Ashford would make her New York Philharmonic debut in a televised New Year's Eve concert celebrating the music of Leonard Bernstein. Also featuring Laura Osnes, Aaron Tveit, and Christopher Jackson, New Year’s Eve: Bernstein on Broadway featured songs from Bernstein's scores for On the Town, West Side Story, Candide, and Wonderful Town. It was accompanied by Bramwell Tovey and aired on PBS on December 31, 2017, at 9:00pm.

Ashford appeared as Elizabeth Cote in four episodes of the mini-series The Assassination of Gianni Versace: American Crime Story, which premiered on January 17, 2018. On February 15, 2018, it was announced that Ashford would lead a single-camera comedy pilot Southern Hospitality for ABC. Tristram Shapeero was set to direct. The pilot was not picked up.

Ashford co-starred in the Jennifer Lopez-led comedy film Second Act as Hildy, opposite Vanessa Hudgens. The film was released in 2018. On July 23, 2018, it was announced that Ashford would be starring in American Reject, a new musical film.

Ashford was set to reprise her role as Dot/Marie in Sunday In The Park With George at the Savoy Theatre in London in 2020. However, due to the COVID-19 pandemic, the run was postponed to 2021.

In February 2020, Ashford was cast as one of the two main lead roles for the CBS situation comedy B Positive, in which she plays Gina, an unstable woman who is the perfect match for a person in need of a kidney, who happens to be a divorced father who she knows from the past. For its second season, the series was revamped and centered on Ashford's character. Ashford also performed the series' lengthy opening theme in a musical-theater style. The final episode aired March 10, 2022. The series was greenlit by CBS on May 8, 2020, as an entry in the 2020–21 television season.

In 2021 she played Paula Jones in the drama American Crime Story: Impeachment.

In 2023 she will appear in the Broadway revival of Sweeney Todd: The Demon Barber of Fleet Street as Mrs. Lovett.

Personal life
Ashford has coeliac disease, and therefore maintains a strict gluten-free diet. Ashford and fellow actor Joe Tapper were married at the Devil's Thumb Ranch in Tabernash, Colorado on July 29, 2013. On May 11, 2016, People announced that Ashford was pregnant with their first child, a boy. Ashford and Tapper's son was born in 2016.

Credits

Theatre

Sources:

Film

Television

Sources:

Discography
 2007: Legally Blonde (Original Broadway Cast Recording)
 2013: Dogfight (Original Cast Recording)
 2013: "Love Me Back" – single (with Richard Hall)
 2013: "Stand Beside Me" – single (with Richard Hall)
 2013: Kinky Boots (Original Broadway Cast Recording)
 2013: Frozen (Original Motion Picture Soundtrack)
 2014: "Another Time (Andrew's Song)" – single (with Will Van Dyke)
 2014: Ahrens & Flaherty: Nice Fighting You (A 30th Anniversary Celebration Live at 54 Below)
 2015: Lost in the Stars: Live at 54 Below
 2016: The Rocky Horror Picture Show: Let's Do the Time Warp Again
 2016: "A New Year" – single (with Will Van Dyke & Jeff Talbott)
 2017: Sunday in the Park with George (2017 New Broadway Cast Recording)
 2020: Thankful: An Album for Jerad Bortz

Sources:

Concerts
On April 7, 2008, Ashford made her professional cabaret debut as a part of the Broadway at Birdland series at Birdland Jazz Club. She performed an early version of what has now become her critically acclaimed Lost in the Stars show. Many songs from her debut, including "Love Hurts", "Mona Lisas and Mad Hatters", and the titular song, "Lost in the Stars", stayed with the show and are now featured on her live album. Alex Lacamoire served as her musical director.

In February 2014, Ashford made her 54 Below concert debut with her now acclaimed cabaret show, Lost in the Stars. After two sold-out shows on the 3rd of the month, Ashford added an encore performance due to popular demand. She returned to 54 Below for a special Christmas-themed reincarnation of her cabaret act for the first two Mondays of December with "a little more holiday cheer involved". She was reviewed by Stephen Holden of The New York Times for her show on December 1. On February 11, 2015, it was announced that Ashford would be joined by Van Dyke and The Whiskey Five band in a tour of her acclaimed cabaret show in five cities. In addition to her February 11 return to 54 Below, she also played in Chicago, San Francisco, Las Vegas, and two special shows in her hometown of Denver, Colorado.

On August 30, 2015, Ashford had a secret popup Brunch With Annaleigh: The Concert at 54 Below, which was an extension of the Lost in the Stars show. This concert was recorded to serve as part of Ashford's debut album, which is a compilation of multiple New York City dates at 54 Below in 2014 and 2015.

Ashford's debut album, Lost in the Stars: Live at 54 Below, recorded from her stage show, was released  November 13, 2015.

Ashford returned to 54 Below for a New Year's Eve special, Lost in the Stars: New Year's Magic. On November 26, 2015, Lost in the Stars was nominated for a BroadwayWorld Cabaret Award in the category "Best Show, Celebrity Female". On September 13, 2016, it was announced that Ashford would once again return to 54 Below for an updated version of Lost in the Stars: New Year's Magic.

Awards and nominations

References

External links

 
 Annaleigh Ashford – Approved Fansite
 
 

1985 births
21st-century American actresses
Actresses from Denver
American film actresses
American musical theatre actresses
American sopranos
American stage actresses
American television actresses
American voice actresses
Audiobook narrators
Drama Desk Award winners
Living people
Marymount Manhattan College alumni
Tony Award winners
21st-century American women singers